Manderlay is a 2005 avant-garde drama film written and directed by Lars von Trier, the second and final part of von Trier's projected USA – Land of Opportunities trilogy. It stars Bryce Dallas Howard, who replaces Nicole Kidman in the role of Grace Mulligan. The film co-stars Willem Dafoe, replacing James Caan. Lauren Bacall, Željko Ivanek, Jeremy Davies, and Chloë Sevigny return portraying different characters from those in Dogville.
Only John Hurt, Udo Kier, and Jean-Marc Barr reprise their roles. The film was internationally co-produced with seven different European countries.

The staging is very similar to Dogville, which was shot on a sparsely dressed sound stage. As in the case of Dogville, Manderlays action is confined to a small geographic area, in this case a plantation. The film is dedicated in memory of a French film producer, Humbert Balsan (1954-2005).

Plot
The film is told in eight straight chapters:
 In which we happen upon Manderlay and meet the people there
 "The freed enterprise of Manderlay"
 "The Old Lady's Garden"
 In which Grace means business
 "Shoulder to Shoulder"
 Hard times at Manderlay
 "Harvest"
 In which Grace settles with Manderlay and the film ends

Set in 1933, the film takes up the story of Grace and her father after burning the town of Dogville at the end of the previous film. Grace and her father travel in convoy with a number of gunmen through rural Alabama where they stop briefly outside a plantation called Manderlay. As the gangsters converse, a black woman emerges from Manderlay's front gates complaining that someone is about to be whipped for stealing a bottle of wine.

Grace enters the plantation and learns that within it, slavery persists, roughly 70 years after the American Civil War and the Emancipation Proclamation. Grace is appalled and insists on staying at the plantation with a small contingent of gunmen and her father's lawyer, Joseph, in order to guarantee the slaves' safe transition to freedom. Shortly after Grace's father and the remaining gangsters depart, Mam, the master of the house, dies, but not before asking Grace to burn a notebook containing "Mam's Law," an exhaustive code of conduct for the entire plantation and all its inhabitants, free and slave. She reads the descriptions of each variety of slave that can be encountered, which include:
 Group 1: Proudy Nigger
 Group 2: Talkin' Nigger
 Group 3: Weepin' Nigger
 Group 4: Hittin' Nigger
 Group 5: Clownin' Nigger
 Group 6: Losin' Nigger
 Group 7: Pleasin' Nigger (also known as a chameleon, a person of the kind who can transform himself into exactly the type the beholder would like to see)

The principal seven divisions are each populated by a single adult slave at Manderlay, who congregate daily and converse on a "parade ground," with Roman numerals of the numbers 1 through 7 designating where each slave stands. "Mam's Law" contains further provisions against the use of cash by slaves, or the felling of trees on the property for timber.

All of this information disgusts Grace and inspires her to take charge of the plantation in order to punish the slave owners and prepare the slaves for life as free individuals. In order to guarantee that the former slaves will not continue to be exploited as sharecroppers, Grace orders Joseph to draw up contracts for all Manderlay's inhabitants, institutionalizing a form of cooperative living in which the white family works as slaves and the blacks collectively own the plantation and its crops. Throughout this process, Grace lectures all those present about the notions of freedom and democracy, using rhetoric entirely in keeping with the ideology of racial equality which most contemporary Americans had yet to embrace.

However, as the film progresses, Grace fails to embed these principles in Manderlay's community in a form she considers satisfactory. Furthermore, her suggestions for improving the conditions of the community backfire on several occasions, such as using the surrounding trees for timber, which leaves the crops vulnerable to dust storms. After a year of such tribulations, the community harvests its cotton and successfully sells it, marking the high point of Grace's involvement. Subsequently, she un-enthusiastically has sex with one of the ex-slaves who also steals and gambles away all of the cotton profits. Finally admitting her failure, Grace contacts her father and attempts to leave the plantation only to be stopped by the plantation's blacks. At this point it is revealed that "Mam's Law" was not conceived and enforced by Mam or any of the other whites, but instead by Wilhelm, the community's eldest member, as a means of maintaining the status quo after the abolition of slavery, protecting the blacks from a hostile outside world. As in many von Trier films, the idealistic main character becomes frustrated by the reality he or she encounters.

Cast

Production

Nicole Kidman and James Caan did not return in the film, the former due to scheduling conflicts while the latter disapproves the film, which was subjected by Caan as anti-American culture and slavery.

In terror over her sex scene, Bryce Dallas Howard said she went through it in a hypnotic state. After the first take she excused herself and went to the bathroom to collect her thoughts. Then she just started to look at it as some sort of comedic scene. "Just in my head. And interestingly enough, Lars kind of felt that. The scene wasn't written funny at all, but there are some really eccentric and absurd moments in that scene that people tend to chuckle at."

Donkey killing 
During production, a donkey was slaughtered for dramatic purposes. The scene was cut from the film before it was released.

Release

Critical reception
Manderlay received mixed reviews from critics. , the film holds a 50% approval rating on review aggregation site Rotten Tomatoes, based on 103 reviews with an average rating of 5.70/10. The website's critics consensus reads: "Manderlay may work better as a political statement than as a film, making its points at the expense of telling a compelling story." On Metacritic, the film has a weighted average score of 46 out of 100, based on 29 critics, indicating "mixed or average reviews".

Anthony Lane of The New Yorker said, "Von Trier is not so much a filmmaker as a misanthropic mesmerist, who uses movies to bend the viewer to his humorless will," while Josh Kun of the Los Angeles Times added, "Trier gets lost in his own rhetoric."

Conversely, The Guardian film critic Peter Bradshaw and Roger Ebert both gave the film mildly positive reviews. While noting, "Many moviegoers are likely to like the film less than the discussion it drags them into," Ebert opined, "The crucial difference between Manderlay and the almost unbearable Dogville is not that [von Trier's] politics have changed, but that his sense of mercy for the audience has been awakened." Peter Bradshaw claimed that Manderlay "is a wind-up, but an effective wind-up," and wrote of von Trier's Land of Opportunities trilogy, "My guess is you can throw away the first and third movies and keep this one."

Box office
The film did not perform well at the box-office, taking a total of only $674,918. Compared to its production budget of $14.2 million, this makes it a box office bomb.

Accolades
Manderlay was entered into the 2005 Cannes Film Festival.

Soundtrack
The Manderlay soundtrack, including songs from the film Dogville, was arranged by composer Joachim Holbek, and released through Milan Records.
 "Dogville Overture" – (Vivaldi Concert in G Major)
 "Thoughts of Tom" – (Handel Concerto Grosso in D Major)
 "Happy at Work" – (Oboe Concerto Albinoni Concerto For Oboe in D Minor)
 "Dogville Theme" – (Vivaldi Concert in G Major)
 "The Gifts" – (Flute And Cembalo Vivaldi Concerto For Flute in D Minor)
 "Happy Times in Dogville" – (Albinoni Concerto For Oboe in D Minor)
 "Fast Motion" – (Vivaldi Concert in G Major)
 "The Fog" – (Vivaldi "Madrigalesco" RV 139)
 "Grace Gets Angry" – (Vivaldi "Nisi Dominus" RV 608)
 "Change of Time" – (Pergolesi "Stabat Mater")
 "Manderlay Theme" – (Vivaldi Concerto For Basson in a Minor)
 "Mam's Death" – (Vivaldi Concert in G Minor)
 "The Child" – (Vivaldi "Al Santo Sepolcro" and Pergolesi "Quando Corpus Morietur")
 "The Swallows Arrive" – (Handel Aria)
 "Young Americans" – David Bowie

See also
List of films featuring slavery

References

External links
 
 
 
 

2005 films
2005 drama films
Danish drama films
Swedish drama films
Dutch drama films
French drama films
German drama films
British drama films
Italian drama films
English-language Danish films
English-language Dutch films
English-language French films
English-language German films
English-language Italian films
English-language Swedish films
Films directed by Lars von Trier
Danish avant-garde and experimental films
Fictional populated places
Animal cruelty incidents in film
Casting controversies in film
Obscenity controversies in film
Films about race and ethnicity
Films about American slavery
Films set in 1933
Films set in Alabama
Films set on farms
Films shot in Denmark
Films shot in Sweden
2000s avant-garde and experimental films
French avant-garde and experimental films
German avant-garde and experimental films
British avant-garde and experimental films
Swedish avant-garde and experimental films
2000s English-language films
2000s British films
2000s French films
2000s German films
2000s Swedish films